George C. Williams is an Indian cinematographer, who works in the Tamil, Telugu and  Malayalam film industry.

Career
As a youngster, George C. Williams revealed he had a passion for keeping track of lighting, camera angles and framing in Tamil films, often observing the work of P. C. Sreeram, Santhosh Sivan and Jeeva during his school days. He subsequently pursued a degree in Visual Communication from Madras Christian College, learning more about the art of cinematography. In college, he got to know Atlee Kumar, whom he then worked with in his films Raja Rani and Theri. George gained entry into films through a family friend, the choreographer Kalyan, who introduced him to cinematographer Nirav Shah to join as an assistant. He subsequently first helped out as a second unit cameraman in Billa (2007) and then in Sarvam (2009). He subsequently also worked with Arjun Jena for the Telugu film Ala Modalaindi (2011), revealing his early stint helped him get used to the technology involved. Another early assignment he was given, was the video of "Nenjodu Cherthu" from the music album Yuvvh (2012), directed by Alphonse Putharen and his work in the project won him rave reviews from the Malayali audience. He was subsequently signed by AR Murugadoss to be the main cinematographer for his production, Atlee's Raja Rani (2013) and then Kaththi (2014). The success of both films, catapulted George into among the leading cinematographers in Tamil films. He subsequently signed projects in Malayalam and Telugu cinema.

Filmography

As cinematographer

Awards and nominations

References

External links

 

Living people
Artists from Chennai
Tamil film cinematographers
M.G.R. Government Film and Television Training Institute alumni
Cinematographers from Tamil Nadu
Year of birth missing (living people)